Infopulse (also known as Infopulse Ukraine LLC) is an international software development, IT Operations and IT outsourcing company headquartered in Kyiv, Ukraine. As of May 2022, the company has 2,300+ specialists and a number of software development centers, sales centers, and branch offices in 7 countries across Western and Eastern Europe, and Americas.

The company was founded in 1991 in Kyiv, Ukraine by Oleksiy Sihov and Andriy Anisimov.

In 2007, Infopulse became a part of Norwegian information technology company EDB Business Partner ASA. After a 2010 merger of EDB with a Nordic corporation ErgoGroup, in 2011 Infopulse became 100% owned subsidiary of the newly formed information technology company EDB ErgoGroup ASA, which later was renamed to EVRY and currently is known as Tietoevry, following the merger of EVRY and Finnish IT company Tieto in 2019.

Infopulse specializes in application management and IT infrastructure management, software research and development, software maintenance and ITO. The company also provides Business Process Outsourcing services, Application Packaging services, development of mobile applications and software as well as IT consulting services.

Infopulse is a member of the Ukrainian Hi-Tech Initiative, European Business Association, and Lviv IT Cluster - non-profit organizations, uniting IT outsourcing companies, organizations and experts specializing in information technologies.

History 

May, 1991 — Oleksiy Sihov and Andriy Anisimov founded the company to develop computer-based monitoring systems for fire stations in Kyiv, Moscow, and other cities of the former USSR.

February, 1992 — the management of the company signed its first contract with a French company. At that period the company provided outstaffing services, i.e., provided production staff for the projects of other companies and did not develop software on-site.

By 1996 the company grew a team of approximately 40 software developers.

1996–1997, the company won the World Bank tender to develop an internal information system for the Kyiv Tax Administration. The project became the first big independent project of the company.

1999 — the Ukrainian team got access to the western market of IT services by partnering with a Netherlands-based company.

Spring 2000 - Infopulse signed a contract with Kyriba Corporation, France, which was the leader in the European IT market at that time. This partnership provided Infopulse with stable annual turnover and staff growth by 30-35%.

April 2004 — Infopulse was certified as meeting the requirements of ISO 9001:2000.

September 2006 — the company negotiated with nine potential business partners, two of which, Bull Corporation (France), and EDB (Scandinavia), were chosen for final consideration.

September 2007 — 60.1% of Infopulse shares have been bought by EDB. Infopulse got access to the Scandinavian IT market and became involved in IT projects for banks, insurance and transport companies in Northern Europe.

March 2009 — Infopulse retained more than 600 experts and had over 200 projects in its portfolio.

October 2010 – Infopulse became a part of Nordic IT company EDB ErgoGroup ASA with over 10,000 employees and annual turnover approaching NOK 13 billion.

March 2012 — following the 2010 merger, EDB ErgoGroup has changed its name to EVRY.

March 2013 – Infopulse opened a subsidiary in Germany.

August 2015 – Infopulse acquired a delivery company in Varna, Bulgaria.

January 2016 – Infopulse opened a regional branch in France.

2017 – Infopulse opened three local Ukrainian delivery centers in Lviv, Kharkiv and Odesa; the company had 1,600+ specialists on board.

2018 – Infopulse expands its presence in the EU by opening a delivery center in Warsaw, Poland; the company enlisted 1,900+ specialists.

Services 

Infopulse provides services in high tech area. Its main activities are:
 Software R&D and Quality Assurance
 Enterprise Mobile Applications Development 
 IT Infrastructure Management and Cloud Services
 SAP-, Microsoft-, AWS- and Oracle-based systems implementation, integration and support
 Application Packaging and Virtualization
 Security Consulting
 Telecom Operations and Customer Service
 Business Process Outsourcing

Clients 

Infopulse serves clients in banking and finance, telecommunications, energy, pharma & healthcare, insurance, manufacturing, and other industries and subcategories. Most of its customers are located in Germany, Switzerland, the United Kingdom, Belgium, France, the Netherlands, Sweden, Denmark, Norway, and the USA.

Public and IT Education Initiatives 

Infopulse takes a part in various education projects aiming to improve public and IT education in Ukraine.

In 2011, Infopulse partnered together with other companies in order to create BIONIC Hill Innovation Park - a Ukrainian innovation park constructed similarly to the Silicon Valley.

In 2012, Infopulse along with other Ukrainian and international IT-companies and institutions co-launched BIONIC University - the first inter-corporate IT university in Ukraine (Kyiv) working on the premises of National University of Kyiv-Mohyla Academy. The University prepared IT specialists for a new formation, who are globally competitive yet aiming at professional fulfillment in Ukraine.

In 2014, Infopulse became a title partner of the International Championship of Computer Talents "Golden Byte".

In October 2014, Infopulse supported "АСМ-ІСРС" (World Programming Contest) semi-finals

In 2014, Infopulse together with parent company EVRY supported the National University "The Kyiv-Mohyla Academy" program to open larger educational opportunities in IT industry in Ukraine, including second higher education for people who have suffered due to various life circumstances.

In 2016–2017, Infopulse and Ukrainian Center for Educational Quality Assessment (UCEQA) in cooperation with United States Agency for International Development (USAID) restored and improved the External independent testing software system, which provides Ukrainian public education with a transparent school graduation and university admission process.

Charity Causes 

Infopulse takes part in charity projects by helping orphans, disabled military veterans, older people, people with Down syndrome, and supporting local charity organizations.

The "Down Syndrome" project. Infopulse together with the Ukrainian Down Syndrome Organization (UDSO) and Down Syndrome Education International (DSEI) launched a long-term charity project in 2010 to help children and people with Down Syndrome in Ukraine. This project raises funds for early development programs and other charity causes through a series of charity events, and aims to spread information and improve public awareness about Down syndrome, by organizing Down syndrome conferences and other related events.

Psychosocial Rehabilitation Centre for military. In December 2015 Infopulse with other international and Ukrainian institutions opened the Psychosocial Rehabilitation Centre which helps war heroes, relocated families, their children and all people, affected by the armed conflict in Ukraine. Center's premises were renovated, refurnished and equipped in accordance with modern WHO and UNICEF standards.

References

External links
Official company website
Tietoevry official website

Outsourcing companies of Ukraine
Business process outsourcing companies
Information technology consulting firms
ICT service providers
Engineering software companies
Development software companies
Software companies established in 1991
Organizations based in Kyiv
Software companies of Ukraine
Software companies of Germany
Software companies of Poland
Software companies of Brazil
Software companies of Norway
Software companies of Bulgaria
Apax Partners companies
Ukrainian companies established in 1991